Lakefield may refer to:

Places
 Rinyirru (Lakefield) National Park in Queensland, Australia 
 Lakefield, Ontario, Canada
 Lakefield, Templeport, a townland in County Cavan, Ireland
 Lakefield, a community on the north end of Lac Dawson in south Gore, Quebec

United States
 Lakefield Township, Luce County, Michigan
 Lakefield Township, Saginaw County, Michigan
 Lakefield, Minnesota

Other uses
 Lakefield, a 2001 album from Canadian music group Leahy
 Intel Lakefield, a microprocessor made by Intel based on the Tremont microarchitecture